Stefan Antonio Lamanna (born 31 July 1995) is a Canadian professional soccer player who plays as a forward for Darby FC in League1 Ontario.

Club career
In 2016, Lamanna played for League1 Ontario side Durham United FA, scoring five goals in eight appearances. He returned to Durham in 2017, making another seventeen appearances and scoring five goals.

In 2018, Lamanna played for Icelandic 2. deild karla side Tindastóll. He made 21 appearances that season and scored eleven goals, tying for fourth among the league's top scorers.

In 2019, Lamanna joined League1 Ontario side Darby FC and scored four goals in seven appearances that season.

On 27 July 2019, Lamanna signed with Canadian Premier League side York9. That day, he made his debut as a substitute in a 6–2 win over HFX Wanderers. Lamanna went on to make a total of six appearances that season. On 15 November 2019, the club announced that Lamanna would not be returning for the 2020 season.

In 2022, he returned to Darby FC.

References

External links

1995 births
Living people
Association football forwards
Canadian soccer players
Soccer people from Ontario
Sportspeople from Markham, Ontario
People from Pickering, Ontario
Canadian expatriate soccer players
Expatriate soccer players in the United States
Canadian expatriate sportspeople in the United States
Expatriate footballers in Iceland
Canadian expatriate sportspeople in Iceland
Houston Christian Huskies men's soccer players
Vermont Catamounts men's soccer players
York United FC players
League1 Ontario players
2. deild karla players
Canadian Premier League players
Darby FC players
Ungmennafélagið Tindastóll men's football players
Pickering FC players